Qoşadizə (also, Qoşa Dizə and Goshadiza) is a village and municipality in the Babek District of Nakhchivan Autonomous Republic, Azerbaijan.  It has a population of 1,283.

References 

Populated places in Babek District